Pierre Véron (born 20 July 1947) is a French lawyer and specialist in the field of patent litigation.

Professional career 

After his call to the Bar in 1969, Véron founded, in 1971, the business law firm Lamy, Véron, Ribeyre & Associés in Lyon, France. Véron joined the Paris Bar in 1996. In 2001, he established Véron & Associés in Paris and Lyon, a law firm devoted exclusively to the practice of patent litigation. Véron’s experience in cases involving large French and international entities led him to be the first to appear before a French court to plead cases relating to a European patent (1990), a nanotechnology patent (2003) and the infringement of a molecular biology patent (2007). Since 2007, Véron has served as an expert with the European Commission for projects involving the European Union patent court. In 2010 and 2019, he was featured as the Lawyer of the Year for France in the American publication Best Lawyers, in the Practice Area of Intellectual Property Litigation. Since 2006 he has been featured as one of the most highly regarded patent lawyers in the world in the Who's Who Legal ranking.

Professional Associations 

 President of the FNUJA (Fédération Nationale des Unions de Jeunes Avocats, translation: National Federation of Young Lawyers’ Unions) 1977–1978
 Member of the Council of the Ordre des Avocats (translation: the Order of Lawyers) (Lyon, France) 1975–1978
 Member of the CCBE (Council of Bars and Law Societies of Europe) 1979–1982
 President of the AAPI (Association des Avocats de Propriété Industrielle, translation: Association of Industrial Property Lawyers) 1998–2002
 Founder and president of EPLAW (European Patent Lawyers Association) 2001–2004

Publications 

 Saisie-contrefaçon (direction), Dalloz Référence, 3rd edition 2013-2014 
Saisie-contrefaçon, trilingual edition, 2015 
Concise International and European Intellectual Property Law (direction, in collaboration with Thomas Cottier), Kluwer Law International, 2nd edition 2011, Kluwer Law International, 3rd edition 2015.

References 

People from Roanne
1947 births
Living people
20th-century French lawyers
21st-century French lawyers